Marek Valášek (born 12 June 1973) is a Slovak sailor. He competed in the Finn event at the 1996 Summer Olympics.

References

External links
 

1973 births
Living people
Slovak male sailors (sport)
Olympic sailors of Slovakia
Sailors at the 1996 Summer Olympics – Finn
Sportspeople from Trnava